Roaring Lions FC is an Anguillian football club based in Stoney Ground that competes in the AFA Senior League, the top tier of Anguillian football.

Roaring Lions FC are the most titles club in Anguilla, they hold 9 titles last in season 2021.

Honours
Anguillian League: 10
 2000–01, 2001–02, 2002–03, 2005–06, 2009–10, 2013–14, 2016–17, 2020, 2021, 2022

References 

Football clubs in Anguilla
The Valley, Anguilla
Association football clubs established in 1979
1979 establishments in Anguilla
AFA Senior Male League clubs